Jack Sawyer (born May 6, 2002) is an American college football defensive end for the Ohio State Buckeyes.

Early life and high school career
Sawyer grew up in Pickerington, Ohio Where he Attended St. Pius K-8 Catholic school. Attended Pickerington High School North, where he played basketball and football. He was rated a five-star recruit and the best collegiate prospect in the 2021 class by ESPN. After making the school's varsity football team as a backup tight end, he was moved to defensive end and finished the season with 58 tackles, 16.5 tackles for loss and 3.5 sacks. Sawyer committed to play college football at Ohio State shortly after his sophomore season, when he recorded 62 tackles, 15 tackles for loss, and six sacks. He choose the Buckeyes over offers from Michigan, Notre Dame, Penn State, and Oklahoma.

Due to injuries, Sawyer took over as the Panthers' starting quarterback during his junior season. He completed 79 of 135 passes for 1,056 yards and nine touchdowns while rushing for 386 yards and six touchdowns and was named the Ohio Capital Conference-Ohio Division Defensive Player of the Year after recording 13.5 sacks and 19 tackles for loss before suffering a torn MCL in the state playoffs. Sawyer opted not to play in his senior football season due to uncertainties surrounding Covid-19.

College career
Sawyer enrolled at Ohio State a semester early. He won the Rose Bowl in 2022 with the team, but was ejected during the game for targeting Utah quarterback Cameron Rising.

References

External links
Ohio State Buckeyes bio

Living people
People from Pickerington, Ohio
Players of American football from Ohio
American football defensive ends
Ohio State Buckeyes football players
2002 births